Charles Anthony s/o R. Santiago (born 1 November 1960) is a Malaysian politician from the Democratic Action Party (DAP), a component party of the Pakatan Harapan (PH) opposition coalition. He has served as Chairman of the Human Rights and Constitutional Affairs Select Committee since December 2019. He is also Chairman of the Association of Southeast Asian Nations (ASEAN) Parliamentarians for Human Rights (APHR).  He served as the Member of Parliament (MP) for Klang from March 2008 to November 2022 and Chairman of the National Water Services Commission (SPAN) from November 2018 to October 2020.

Political career 

Santiago was first elected to Parliament in the 2008 election winning the seat of Klang from the governing National Front (BN) coalition. Prior to his election, Santiago was an economist and worked for non-governmental organisations such as the Coalition Against Water Privatisation and Monitoring Sustainability of Globalisation Malaysia. Santiago was re-elected to Parliament for Klang constituency in the consecutive 2013 and 2018 general elections.

Election results

See also 
 Klang (federal constituency)

References 

1960 births
People from Selangor
Living people
Malaysian Christians
Malaysian politicians of Indian descent
Democratic Action Party (Malaysia) politicians
Members of the Dewan Rakyat
21st-century Malaysian politicians